Dovžan may refer to:

 Dovžan Gorge in Slovenia
 Dovžan Gorge Formation in Slovenia
 Alenka Dovžan (born 1976), Slovene alpine skier
 Miha Dovžan (born 1994), Slovene biathlete

See also
 

Slovene-language surnames